Kunzea newbeyi is a flowering plant in the myrtle family, Myrtaceae and is endemic to a small area along the south coast of Western Australia. It is a robust shrub with small leaves and groups of about twenty to thirty pink flowers in October and November.

Description
The flowers are arranged in more or less spherical groups of 15 to 35, on the ends of branches which continue to grow after flowering. The flowers are surrounded by glabrous, egg-shaped bracts and bracteoles. Flowering occurs in October and November and is followed by fruit which are urn-shaped capsules with the sepals remaining as erect lobes.

Taxonomy and naming
Kunzea newbeyi was first formally described by Hellmut R. Toelken in 1996 in the article A revision of the genus Kunzea (Myrtaceae) in the Journal of the Adelaide Botanic Garden.  The specific epithet (newbeyi) honours Mr. K. Newbey who was the first to make a collection of this species.

Distribution and habitat
This kunzea is often found on the dry lower slopes of breakaway areas in a small area along the southern coast in the Great Southern region.

Conservation
Kunzea newbeyi is only known from five populations but has recently been discovered in large numbers in the Monjebup Reserve. It is classed as "Priority One" by the Government of Western Australia Department of Parks and Wildlife, meaning that it is known from only one or a few locations which are potentially at risk.

References

newbeyi
Endemic flora of Western Australia
Myrtales of Australia
Rosids of Western Australia
Critically endangered flora of Australia
Plants described in 1996
Taxa named by Hellmut R. Toelken